H. K. Sema (born 1 June 1943) is a former judge of the Supreme Court of India. He has also served as the Chairperson of Uttar Pradesh Human Right Commission.

Early life
Sema was born on 1 June 1943. He completed his graduation from St Joseph's College, Darjeeling in 1967 and LLB from Government Law College, Mumbai in 1970.

Posts held
Junior Government Advocate, Nagaland in 1971-1975.
Assistant Advocate General, Nagaland from 16 November 1985.
Judge of Guwahati High Court, Kohima Bench, 1992-2001 
Judge of High Court of Jammu and Kashmir, 7 June 2001. Appointed Chief Justice of High Court of Jammu and Kashmir on 12 September 2001.
Appointed as Chief Justice of Gujarat High Court on 25 January 2000.
Elevated as Judge of the Supreme Court of India, 2002 to 2008.
Chairperson of Uttar Pradesh Human Rights Commission.

References

1943 births
Naga people
Living people
20th-century Indian judges
21st-century Indian judges
Justices of the Supreme Court of India